Joniece Jamison (born December 11, 1956 in Baltimore, Maryland, United States) is an American singer. In France, she achieved notability recording two successful duets with French artist François Feldman: "Joue pas" in 1989 and "J'ai peur" in 1991, which were both top ten hit in France). Her album Gospel peaked at #144 in France in January 2005.

She had also collaborated with many notable artists such as Elton John, Catherine Lara, Sylvie Vartan and was notably a backing singer with Eurythmics in the 1980s (and subsequently also on the Dave Stewart-endorsed first Shakespears Sister album in 1989), and with Soma Riba in the 2000s.

Personal life 
Mother of two, Jamison has lived in France since 1980 after being invited by the French singer Sylvie Vartan, whom she met in the United States.

Discography

Album 
 1990 : Life
 1994 : Dream in Color
 2007 : Nuances Gospel

Singles 
 1984 : "Polar" maxi single with Bernard Guyvan (Phil Barney and Debbie Davis)
 1989 : "Joue pas" (in duo with François Feldman)
 1991 : "J'ai peur" (in duo with François Feldman)
 2004 : "A chance to Be Free" (on a music of Marc Kowalczyk)

References

American women singers
American emigrants to France
French women singers
Living people
1956 births